Hillside Colony is a census-designated place (CDP) and Hutterite colony in Spink County, South Dakota, United States. It was first listed as a CDP prior to the 2020 census. The population of the CDP was 123 at the 2020 census.

It is in the southeast part of the county, bordered to the southeast by Foster Creek, a southwest-flowing tributary of the James River.

Demographics

References 

Census-designated places in Spink County, South Dakota
Census-designated places in South Dakota
Hutterite communities in the United States